was the twentieth of the fifty-three stations of the Tōkaidō. It is located in what is now part of Suruga Ward in Shizuoka City, Shizuoka Prefecture, Japan. It can also be written as 丸子宿 (Mariko-juku).

History
Mariko-juku was one of the smallest post stations on the Tōkaidō. Old row-houses from the Edo period can be found between Mariko-juku and Okabe-juku, its neighboring post station, in Utsuinotani. This post town also had strong ties to the Minamoto, Imagawa and Tokugawa clans.

The classic ukiyo-e print by Andō Hiroshige (Hōeidō edition) from 1831–1834 depicts two travellers at a wayside restaurant which name is Chouji-ya(), it is noted for Tororo-Jiru (grated japanese yam soup) and founded in 1596, from which another traveller has just departed.

Neighboring post towns
Tōkaidō
Fuchū-shuku - Mariko-juku - Okabe-juku

Further reading
Carey, Patrick. Rediscovering the Old Tokaido:In the Footsteps of Hiroshige. Global Books UK (2000). 
Chiba, Reiko. Hiroshige's Tokaido in Prints and Poetry. Tuttle. (1982) 
Traganou, Jilly. The Tokaido Road: Travelling and Representation in Edo and Meiji Japan. RoutledgeCurzon (2004).

References

Stations of the Tōkaidō
Stations of the Tōkaidō in Shizuoka Prefecture